Cecropia is a term derived from the Ancient Greek κέκρωψ (kékrōps, Latinized: cecrops) which means "face with a tail" and refers to the mythical first king of Athens.

"Cecropia" can refer to:

 Cecropia, a genus of trees from the American tropics
 Cecropia, an  albedo feature on Mars
 "Cecropia", a short story by Susan Hanniford Crowley, published in Sword and Sorceress XV
 Cecropia or Kekropia (Κεκροπία), an old name for the Acropolis of Athens
 Cecropia moth, the North American moth species Hyalophora cecropia
 Apis mellifera cecropia or Greek bee, a subspecies of the western honey bee
 Cecropians/Cecropia Federation, an alien species and its faction in the Heritage Universe

See also
 Cecrops I
 Cecrops II
 Kekropia